This is a list of the largest historic peaceful gatherings of people in the world at one place for a single event.

Over ten million

Five to ten million 
 Around 7–9 million gathered in Karbala, Iraq to commemorate the martyrdom anniversary of Imam Hussein in October 2015.
 An estimated 7.5 million people gathered in New York City, United States on 20 April 1951 to honor General Douglas MacArthur just 15 days after he was relieved of duty by President Truman.
 An estimated six to seven million attended the Mass in Rizal Park, Manila, on 18 January 2015 that concluded the apostolic and state visit of Pope Francis in the Philippines. It was held on the Feast of the Santo Niño, and is the largest papal crowd in history.
 Over six million people gather at Karbala on 6 July 2012 to celebrate 15 Mid-Sha'ban.
 An estimated six million worshippers gathered at the shrine of Imam Hussein in Karbala on 8 August 2009 during Mid-Sha'ban.
 Over 5.5 million turned up for the Traslación of the Black Nazarene in 2015 in Manila, Philippines, ahead of Pope Francis' visit.
 More than five million pilgrims went on the 15th of Shaban (Mid Shaban) to Karbala at the Shrine of Imam Husain 20 July 2011.
 Over five million people attended the World Youth Day 1995 in Manila, Philippines, to see Pope John Paul II. It was the largest papal crowd in history, until being surpassed on 18 January 2015 during the visit of Pope Francis also in Manila.
 An estimated five million people attended the Democracy and Martyrs' Rally in Istanbul on 7 August 2016, according to the Istanbul Police Department.
 An estimated five million people gathered in Buenos Aires, Argentina for a parade celebrating the success of the Argentina national football team in the 2022 FIFA World Cup.

Two to five million 
 An estimated crowd of over five million people attended the 2016 World Series parade in Chicago, Illinois after the Chicago Cubs won their first World Series since 1908, according to the Chicago Office of Emergency Management and Communications. However, Geoffrey Baer stated that there are plenty of reasons to be skeptical about that number, and that the OEMC did not respond multiple calls made by WTTW to consult about the method used to come up with the crowd figure. 

 An estimated five million pilgrims gathered to mourn the death anniversary of Imam Kazim at Al-Kadhimiya Mosque in Kadhimiyah on 30 June 2011.

 An estimated five million people attended the funeral of Egyptian President Gamal Abdel Nasser on 1 October 1970 in Cairo, Egypt.
 An estimated five million devotees attended the Bishwa Ijtema in Bangladesh in 2010.
 An estimated five million people gathered in Sabarimala, India on 14 January 2007 to watch 'Makarajyothi', a bright flame that flickers three times on a remote hillside of Ponnambalamedu.
 An estimated 4.2 million people attended a concert given by Rod Stewart in Rio de Janeiro, Brazil on 31 December 1994.
 Over four million people flocked to Karbala on the day of Ashura at the shrines of Imam Hussein and his younger paternal half brother Abbas in 2010.
 An estimated four million people attended the funeral of Umm Kulthum in Cairo, Egypt on 6 February 1975.
 An estimated four million people attended the WorldPride march in New York City on 30 June 2019.
 An estimated 3.5 million people attended the concert given by Jean-Michel Jarre for the celebration of the 850th birthday of Moscow, in 1997.
 An estimated 3.16 million people made the annual Hajj to Mecca, Saudi Arabia in 2012 (1.4 million Saudis and 1.75 million foreigners)
 An estimated 3.2 million people gathered for the annual feast of the Santo Niño de Cebú (Child [Jesus] of Cebu) on 19 January 2014. The crowd attended the solemn procession in the main streets of Cebu City, Philippines.
 Three million Shia Muslims commemorated the anniversaries of the deaths of Muhammad and Imam Hassan in Najaf on shrine of Imam Ali on 28 Safra (3 February) 2011
 Over three million renew pledge of allegiance to Imam Ali in Najaf on 16 November 2011
 More than three million devotees had gathered in the first Nabakalebara Ratha Yatra of the millennium in Puri, India which took place after a gap of 19 years.
 Three million break their fasts at Imam Reza shrine Iran on Ramadan 13 July 2013 world's largest iftar ever.
 An estimated 2.5–4.5 million people gathered for the funeral of Iran's Ex-President Akbar Hashemi Rafsanjani in Tehran on 10 January 2017.
 More than three million people protested in the Circus Maximus, Rome, on 23 March 2002, in a demonstration organized by the left-wing trade union CGIL, led by Sergio Cofferati, against the labour reform promoted by the conservative government of Silvio Berlusconi.
 An estimated three million people marched through Rome, Italy in opposition to the U.S.-led invasion of Iraq in the largest anti-war rally in history on 15 February 2003.
 An estimated three million people welcomed Benazir Bhutto on her return from exile in 1986 in Lahore. The procession covered the 12-kilometer distance from the Lahore airport to Minar e Pakistan in over ten hours. The crowd accumulated at gardens of the landmark accommodated over 1.5 million people with queues of cars and trucks reaching outside the then city limits miles away.
 An estimated three million people attended the closing Mass of World Youth Day 2013 on Copacabana Beach in Rio de Janeiro, Brazil.
 Up to three million people attended the closing Mass of World Youth Day 2016 in Kraków, Poland.
 Over two million people gather there yearly on the night of 31 December, making it the world's largest New Year's Eve party.
 An estimated three million people gathered in London, United Kingdom on 2 June 1953 to celebrate the Coronation of Queen Elizabeth II.
 An estimated three million people attended a parade in Boston, United States, celebrating the Boston Red Sox's 2004 World Series victory on 30 October 2004. The victory ended an 86-year drought of World Series championships and ended the era of the famous Curse of the Bambino for the Red Sox.
 An estimated two to four million people are reported to have attended the funeral of Pope John Paul II in Rome, Italy on 8 April 2005.
 An estimated 2.8 million people made the annual Hajj to Mecca, Saudi Arabia (excluding unregistered pilgrims which were over 0.75 million, the number of pilgrims would then be over 3.5 million) in November 2010.
 An estimated 2.6 million people attended the annual feast of the Black Nazarene in Manila, Philippines, in January 2008.
 An estimated 2.5 million people attended Puneeth Rajkumar Funeral at Bangalore, India on 29 October 2021.
 An estimated 2.5 million people participated in Art of Living Silver Jubilee Celebration at Bangalore, India.
 An estimated 2.5 million people participated in a beatification mass held by Pope John Paul II in Błonia Park, Kraków, Poland.
 An estimated 2.5 million people participated in the São Paulo Gay Pride Parade that took place in June 2006 in São Paulo, Brazil.
 An estimated 2.5 million people attended Mahatma Gandhi's funeral on 31 January 1948, in New Delhi, India.

 An estimated two million people attended a parade and rally in Chicago, Illinois, United States for the 2013 Stanley Cup Champion Chicago Blackhawks.
 An estimated two million people gathered in Philadelphia, US, for the Stanley Cup parade for the 1974 Stanley Cup Champions, the Philadelphia Flyers.
 An estimated two million people lined Broad Street in Philadelphia, US, on 31 October 2008 for a ticker-tape parade celebrating the 2008 World Series champions, the Philadelphia Phillies.
 An estimated two million people attended the state funeral of the assassinated President of Bangladesh Ziaur Rahman on 2 June 1981.
 An estimated two million people are reported to have gathered in Madrid, Spain for a parade celebrating the success of the Spain national football team in the 2010 FIFA World Cup.
 An estimated two million Hindu women gathered at the Attukal Temple in Kerala, India on 4 March 2007, making it the largest gathering of women in history, overtaking the record set by the same festival on 23 February 1997.
 An estimated two million people participated in Baltic Way demonstration for independence, forming a 675 km uninterrupted human chain between Vilnius (Lithuania), Riga (Latvia) and Tallinn (Estonia) on 23 August 1989.
 On 25 May 2010, an estimated 2 million people gathered at the 9 de Julio avenue in Buenos Aires, Argentina, to attend several concerts and street art parades celebrating the Bicentennial of the May Revolution.
 The funeral of Bal Thackeray on 18 November 2012: two million, and a 7 km long cortege.
 In 2001, two million devotees attended the World Ijtema in Dhaka, Bangladesh.
 An estimated two million Filipino nuns, soldiers, priests, and different people gathered for the People Power Revolution 1986 (EDSA I) held at EDSA in the Philippines, resulting in the downfall of President Ferdinand Marcos.
 An estimated two million Filipino people attended the funeral processions of Benigno Aquino Jr. on 31 August 1983 and his wife Corazon Aquino on 5 August 2009.
 An estimated two million Catholic youths attended World Youth Day in August 2000 in Rome, Italy.
 More than two million Muslims gather at Mount Arafat for the important ritual as part of Hajj 2016
 An estimated two million people gathered at Raja Bazaar, Rawalpindi on 24 December 2013 after threats from Takfiri groups due to Ashura riots Shia Muslims gathered to commemorate Chehlum of Imam Hussain. Takfiris despite all their threats had to retreat.
 An estimated two million members of the Iglesia ni Cristo attended the 100th anniversary celebrations of the church on 27 July 2014 in Ciudad de Victoria, Bocaue, Bulacan.
 An estimated two million gathered in London, United Kingdom for the wedding of Charles, Prince of Wales, and Lady Diana Spencer on 29 July 1981.
 An estimated two million people gathered at Hussani Chuk Skardu, Gilgit-Baltistan Pakistan on 9 August 2013, Ashura, Shia Muslims gathered to commemorate Majlis of Imam Hussain.
 About two million people gathered in Hong Kong on 16 June 2019, which is around 30% of the population, marched through the north of Hong Kong Island the day after Hong Kong Chief Executive Carrie Lam delayed a controversial extradition bill, calling on her to completely withdraw the legislation and resign. The crowd also protested against the violence of the city's police force towards the protestors on 12 June 2019.

 An estimated two million people attended the Toronto Raptors 2019 NBA Championship parade on 17 June 2019
 Nearly two million people attended Hong Kong's controversial extradition bill protest on 18 August 2019, after the Chief Executive Carrie Lam announced the indefinite suspension of the bill on 15 June. The attendees asked the Hong Kong government to respond their 5 demands as well as protested against the abusive violence use of the city's police force and its collusion with the mobs. The organiser claimed a total number of attendees with over 1.7 million (only counting people in Causeway Bay and Tin Hau areas) while lot of people gathered around Wan Chai, Central and Sheung Wan. An estimated number of over 2 million people took part in the march.

One to two million 

 An estimated two million people attended in Monas, Jakarta during 212 gathering that demanded for the termination of the gubernatorial office held by Basuki Tjahaja Purnama (Ahok), who had been accused as a suspect in the blasphemy case.
 An estimated 1.5–2 million people in Hong Kong (the city at the time had a population of roughly 5.5 million) expressed their support for the students in the Tiananmen Square protests of 1989. The line of people extended from North Point to Sheung Wan, with all six lanes of King's Road (Hong Kong), Hennessy Road and Des Voeux Road crowded with people. Many underground MTR stations on Hong Kong Island were full of people and many people who could not participate in the demonstration above ground were stuck in the congested MTR stations, therefore the exact amount of demonstrators could only be estimated to around 1.5–2 million people.
 Security officials estimated that 1.8 million people attended the inauguration of Barack Obama in Washington, D.C. on 20 January 2009.
 An estimated 1.8 million people claimed Catalan independence in Barcelona, 11 September 2014, drawing an 11 km. "V" shaped Catalan flag with their red and yellow T-shirt.
 An estimated 1.2 million people gathered in Beirut, Lebanon, on 14 March 2005 to demand an end to the Syrian military presence in Lebanon. This event is known as the Cedar Revolution.
 An estimated 1.2–1.6 million people, including several heads of state, marched in Paris (with a total of 3.7 million marching across the world) on 11 January 2015 for an anti-terrorism rally in the aftermath of the Charlie Hebdo shooting; the gathering was the largest in French history.
 An estimated 1.5  million Brazilians took part in the city of São Paulo of a political protest in favor of direct presidential elections in what is known as the Diretas Já movement, in 1984. It is widely regarded as the largest political protest in Brazil's history.
 An estimated 1.5 million people were at 2013's San Francisco Pride, in the wake of the Supreme Court decisions on DOMA and Proposition 8.
 An estimated 1.5 million people attended the Live 8 concert in Philadelphia, Pennsylvania, 2 July 2005.
 An estimated 1.5 million people attended the funeral of Jawaharlal Nehru in Delhi, India in 1964
 An estimated 1.5 million people claimed the independence of Catalonia in Barcelona, 11 September 2012. More info: 2012 Catalan independence demonstration.
 An estimated 1.1–1.5 million people gather at Pandharpur, India for Vari Pilgrimage on the day of Ashadhi Ekadashi. This is an annual pilgrimage that dates back to 800 years.
 An estimated 1.4 million attended World Youth Day 2011 (16–21 August) in Madrid
 An estimated 1.3 million people attended the 2015–2016 Cleveland Cavaliers Basketball NBA Championship Parade 22 June 2016. The victory ended a 52-year drought of no major professional sport championships for the City of Cleveland.
 An estimated 1.25 million people attended a papal mass given by Pope John Paul II in the Phoenix Park, Dublin, Ireland on 29 September 1979. The estimated attendance was about one third of the population of Ireland gathered in one expansive public area.
 An estimated 1.2 million Chileans marched in what became known as "La marcha más grande de Chile", in Chile's capital of Santiago. The march was a part of a series of protests demanding a new constitution, reforms in Chile's education, healthcare and pension systems, among many other reforms.
 More than 1.2 million Venezuelans attempted to peacefully march in the "Mother of All Marches" throughout Venezuela before they were repressed by authorities on 19 April 2017, with the demonstrations resulting from the 2017 Venezuelan constitutional crisis.
 An estimated 1.2 million people attended the Yoido rally of Sun Myung Moon in Yoido, South Korea in 1975
 More than 1.1 million people assembled at Yoido Plaza in Seoul in South Korea in 1973 for the Billy Graham Crusade
 An estimated more than one million attended the funeral of Italian Communist Party leader Enrico Berlinguer on 13 June 1984 in Rome
 An estimated one million gathered in London, United Kingdom for the funeral of Diana, Princess of Wales on 6 September 1997.
 An estimated one million gathered in London, United Kingdom for the wedding of Prince William and Catherine Middleton on 29 April 2011.
 An estimated one million people gathered in The Mall outside Buckingham Palace in London, United Kingdom for the Golden Jubilee celebrations of Elizabeth II on 4 June 2002.
 An estimated one million people participated in what is considered the largest procession in the history of New Delhi, India on 8 October 1970 in commemoration of Hans Ji Maharaj, led by his son Guru Maharaj Ji (now Prem Rawat).
 An estimated crowd of over one million revelers attended Love Parade in Essen, Germany on 25 August 2007.
 An estimated crowd of over one million Colombians gathered in Bogotá, Colombia on 4 February 2008 to protest against FARC.
 On 1 March 1990, over 1 million protesters gathered at the headquarters of the UN Military Observer Group in Srinagar, Jammu & Kashmir to present a memorandum addressed to the Secretary-General of the United Nations demanding that Kashmir be given the right of self determination.
 An estimated one million Catholics gathered for the mass at Saint Peter's Square, to celebrate John Paul II's beatification on 1 May 2011
 An estimated one million people gathered at Marina Beach, Chennai, India for pro-Jallikattu protest on 21 January 2017.
 Over one million people gathered to on the anniversary of Muhammad's death at the Imam Reza shrine in Mashhad, Iran on 10 December 2015.
 Over one million pilgrims visited the Al-Askari Shrine in Samarra on 15 November 2016.
 On 12 June 1982, an estimated one million people demonstrated in New York City's Central Park against nuclear weapons and for an end to the cold war arms race as part of an ongoing campaign of anti-nuclear protests in the United States. It was the largest anti-nuclear protest and the largest political demonstration in American history.
 Over one million Venezuelans demonstrated on 1 September 2016 during the 2014–16 Venezuelan protests in Caracas, Venezuela, demanding a recall election against President Nicolás Maduro. The gathering was called the "largest demonstration in the history of Venezuela" with over 3% of the nation's entire population.
 An estimated crowd of 750 thousand to 1.5 million people gathered in Central Park in New York City on 22 April 1990 to celebrate Earth Day.
 An estimated crowd of over one million people gathered in Denver, Colorado, United States to celebrate The National Football Leagues Denver Broncos Super Bowl 50 parade.
 An estimated crowd of one million people gathered in London, United Kingdom on 23 March 2019 and marched to Parliament Square to show support for a second referendum on the UK leaving the European Union.
 An estimated crowd of 1.03 million people gathered in Hong Kong on 9 June 2019 and marched to Government Centre to protest against the Extradition Bill that, if passed, allows people to be extradited to China where basic human rights are not guaranteed. A two million people demonstration followed a week later and another one followed two months later (18 August).

Methodology 
A method of determining how many people are at an event is the scientific analysis of photographs, video images, or both.  Based on the quality of the image, it is possible to do a physical head count or to estimate attendance based on the density of people within similar areas.  This permits the estimation of people over large areas or where parts of the image are obscured.  An extensive discussion of how images were used to estimate the number of attendees at the Million Man March can be found at the Center for Remote Sensing at Boston University's website.

References 

 https://www.theguardian.com/world/2019/jan/15/kumbh-mela-hindus-converge-for-largest-ever-human-gathering-prayagraj-festival

Gatherings